Copella nattereri or the spotted tetra is a species of fish in the splashing tetra family found in the upper Amazon basin, as well as the Rio Negro and Orinoco basins. They grow no more than a few centimeters.

The fish is named in honor of Johann Natterer (1787-1843), who explored South America and collected specimens there for 18 years, including the type specimen of this species along with many others.

References

External links
 

Fish of Peru
Fish of Brazil
Fish of Venezuela
Fish of Colombia
Taxa named by Franz Steindachner
Fish described in 1876
Lebiasinidae